Mashra'a Wa Hadnan District is a district of the Taiz Governorate, Yemen. As of 2003, the district had a population of 109,533 inhabitants.

References

Districts of Taiz Governorate